is a semi-arid island in the Gulf of California, off the east coast of the Baja California peninsula. Its surface area is 182.962 km2 (70.642 sq mi), the sixth-largest island in Mexico. The island is also referred to as San José Island in English, though there are other islands by this name.

It is the type locality for the yellow-footed gull and the San José brush rabbit.

References
Land areas of islands in Mexico INEGI

Islands of Baja California Sur
Islands of the Gulf of California